Highland Township is one of five townships in Vermillion County, Indiana, United States. As of the 2010 census, its population was 1,534 and it contained 724 housing units.

Geography

Cities
 Perrysville

Unincorporated towns
 Flat Iron at 
 Gessie at 
 Rileysburg at 
 Tree Spring at 
(This list is based on USGS data and may include former settlements.)

Cemeteries
The township contains ten cemeteries: Ater, Chenoweth, Harrison, Hicks, Hopewell, Hughes, Lower Mound, Skinner, Mathes and Smith.

Airports and landing strips
 Highland Airport (closed)

Rivers
 Wabash River
 Vermilion River

Highways
 Interstate 74
 U.S. Route 136
 Indiana State Road 63
 Indiana State Road 32

School districts
 North Vermillion Community School Corporation

Political districts
 Indiana's 8th congressional district
 State House District 42
 State Senate District 38

References
 U.S. Board on Geographic Names (GNIS)
 United States Census Bureau 2007 TIGER/Line Shapefiles

External links
 Indiana Township Association
 United Township Association of Indiana

Townships in Vermillion County, Indiana
Townships in Indiana